Ruslan Nurudinov (born 24 November 1991) is an Uzbekistani weightlifter of Tatar ethnic origin. He is the first world champion for Uzbekistan in weightlifting (2013). Nurudinov won a gold medal at the 2016 Olympics, setting a new Olympic record in the clean and jerk at 237 kg.

Major results

References

External links

 
 
 
 

Uzbekistani male weightlifters
Olympic weightlifters of Uzbekistan
Weightlifters at the 2012 Summer Olympics
Weightlifters at the 2016 Summer Olympics
1991 births
Living people
People from Andijan
Uzbekistani Muslims
Uzbekistani people of Tatar descent
Weightlifters at the 2010 Asian Games
World Weightlifting Championships medalists
Medalists at the 2016 Summer Olympics
Olympic gold medalists for Uzbekistan
Olympic medalists in weightlifting
Universiade medalists in weightlifting
Asian Games medalists in weightlifting
Asian Games gold medalists for Uzbekistan
Weightlifters at the 2018 Asian Games
Medalists at the 2018 Asian Games
Universiade gold medalists for Uzbekistan
Tatar sportspeople
Medalists at the 2013 Summer Universiade
21st-century Uzbekistani people